GMB Akash is a Bangladeshi documentary photographer.

Life and work
GMB Akash is a Bangladeshi photographer who concentrates on people living on the edge of society around the world. His work has been featured in over 100 major publications including Vogue, Time, Sunday Times, Newsweek, Geo, Stern, Der Spiegel, The Fader, Brand Ein, The Guardian, Marie Claire. etc. The photographs of GMB Akash have been exhibited all over the world. He has received more than 100 international photography awards.

See his TED talk: The Super Heroes of Life.

Akash works as a photographer for Panos Pictures, UK, and founded the First Light Institute of Photography in Narayanganj, Bangladesh in August, 2013.

His work has been featured in The Guardian, the London Sunday Telegraph, The Fader,

Solo exhibitions
 Solo exhibition / book launch: First Light at the Bengal Gallery of Fine Arts. Dhaka, Bangladesh, 2006
 Survivors at Alliance Française de Dhaka, 2009;
 Lugano Photo Festival, Lugano, Switzerland, 2013
 Soulscapes at the Bengal Gallery of Fine Arts, Dhaka, Bangladesh, 2010;
 My Mapless world, Art-Buvette APCd Gallery, Fribourg, Switzerland, 2013

Awards
 2002, third place, Press Foundation of Asia, Bangladesh Chapter, photo contest
 2002, World Press Photo Joop Swart Masterclass, the Netherlands
 2004, Young Reporters Award, The Scope Photo Festival in Paris
 2005, "Best of Show" award from the Center for Fine Art Photography, Colorado, US
 2007, UNICEF Photos of the Year, 2nd place.
 2009, Travel Photographer of the Year winner
 2010, CIWEM Environmental Photographer of the Year, Quality of Life winner
 2014, one of ten finalists in Lugano Photo Days contest, Switzerland

References

External links
 

1977 births
Living people
Bangladeshi photographers
People from Dhaka